Lightweights and Gentlemen is the debut studio album by folk band Lau, released on March 19, 2007.

Track listing
All tracks arranged by Kris Drever, Martin Green and Aidan O'Rourke
 "Hinba" - 5:07
 "Hinba" (O'Rourke)
 "Funny Weather" (Green) 
 "Butcher Boy" - 4:07 (trad. additional words/music by Drever)
 "The Jigs" - 4:50
 "Mattie and Karine's" (O'Rourke)
 "The Lau Jig" (Drever, Green, O'Rourke)
 "The Creche Jig" (Joe Scurfield)
 "Results" - 4:39
 "Come on wee man!" (Green)
 "Waiting for the Results" (Drever)
 "Unquiet Grave" - 5:13 (music - Drever, words - trad.)
 "Souter Creek" - 6:19
 "The Dog and the Rabbit" (Drever)
 "A Dog Called Bran" (O'Rourke)
 "Souter Creek" (O'Rourke)
 "Kris's" - 6:28
 "Alyth's" (O'Rourke)
 "Muckle Moose on the Muin" (Drever)
 "Freeborn Man" - 3:42 (Ewan MacColl)
 "Moorhens" - 4:15
 "The Moorhens" (Drever)
 "Rick Taylor's" (Green)
 "A Tune for Emily Ball (O'Rourke)
 "Gallowhill" - 6:04 (O'Rourke)

Bonus Track
 "Twa Stewarts" (Green) - 7:34
 "Auld Stewart
 "Young Stewart"
 "Last Weeks Efforts"

Personnel
 Kris Drever - guitar, e-bowed dobro guitar, vocals, mixing
 Martin Green - piano-keyed accordion, accordion through Leslie speaker, mixing
 Aidan O'Rourke - fiddle, mixing
 Stuart Hamilton - engineering
 Calum Malcolm - producer, mixing
 Hugo Morris - photography
 Chris Williams - design and layout

2007 debut albums
Lau (band) albums